Deconditioning is adaptation of an organism to less demanding environment, or, alternatively, the decrease of physiological adaptation to normal conditions. Decondition may result from decreased physical activity, prescribed bed rest, orthopedic casting, paralysis, aging, etc.
 A particular interest in the study of deconditioning is in aerospace medicine, to diagnose, fight, and prevent adverse effects of the conditions of space flight.

Deconditioning due to decreased physical effort results in muscle loss, including heart muscles.
 
Deconditioning due to lack of gravity or non-standard gravity action (e.g., during bed rest) results in abnormal distribution of body fluids.

See also
Effect of spaceflight on the human body

References

Physiology